Dorfmann is a German surname. Notable people with the surname include:

Ania Dorfmann (1899–1984), Russian-American pianist and teacher
Herbert Dorfmann (born 1969), Italian agronomist and politician 
Robert Dorfmann (1912–1999), French film producer

See also
Dorfman, surname

German-language surnames